Anna Garcia (born December 31, 1970) is professionally known as Anna Fantastic, a name given to her by Prince. She is an English actress, singer and model.

Early life

Born in London, England in 1970 to parents of Sicilian, British and American ancestry, Fantastic spent her younger years in London and the Netherlands. Her mother was a singer in various bands in the local London music scene and thus exposed Fantastic to a variety of musical genres, from Billie Holiday to Madonna.

Fantastic attended the Sylvia Young Theatre School in London.

Prince years
At the age of 15, Fantastic met the musician Prince at his concert in London. At 17, she lived with Prince in Minneapolis, Minnesota. On Fantastic's 18th birthday, Prince gave her a pink cashmere coat, thus leading to the song "Pink Cashmere" that would be released in 1993. In 1988, under the name Sheree, she recorded a song called "Ronnie – Talk To Russia!", written by Dieter Bohlen, a German songwriter and former member of Modern Talking.

Fantastic inspired the songs "Vicki Waiting" (an 18th-birthday gift for Fantastic, originally titled "Anna Waiting") and "Lemon Crush" (her favorite drink) on Prince's Batman soundtrack from 1989. She wrote the song "Fantasia Erotica", which resurfaced on Carmen Electra's debut album in 1992. Liner notes from the Batman soundtrack, released in 1989, credit her as "Anna Fantastic". Fantastic is featured on one of Prince's unreleased Madhouse albums, on the 18-minute song "The Dopamine Rush Suite".

Post-Prince years

Fantastic recorded several songs in the early to mid-1990s, including "G'Ding – G'Ding (Do You Wanna Wanna?)" in 1990 as Anna G, a remake of Marvin Gaye's "Sexual Healing" in 1994 under her real name, and singles in 1995 as part of the group La Switch ("Kiss Me Baby" and "Never Let You Go!") and as part of the group Positive Connextion ("My Baby Just Cares For Me").

Current
Fantastic is the writer and executive producer of a documentary on Michael Jackson entitled Michael Jackson: The Last Photo Shoot. She has recorded an album of jazz songs, and composed music for television shows including The Oprah Winfrey Show and The Dr. Oz Show.

References

External links
 Anna Fantastic on Myspace

1970 births
Living people
Alumni of the Sylvia Young Theatre School
English people of Sicilian descent
English people of Italian descent
English people of Spanish descent
21st-century English women singers
21st-century English singers
Singers from London